Sampáloc is the Tagalog word sampalok (tamarind) rendered in Spanish orthography. It is the name of certain locations in the Philippines:

 Sampaloc, Manila
 Sampaloc, Quezon
 Lake Sampaloc